Miguel Rivero Bonilla (born 14 March 1952) is a Cuban former footballer who competed in the 1976 Summer Olympics.

International career
He represented his country in 1 FIFA World Cup qualification match.

References

External links
 

1952 births
Living people
Cuban footballers
Cuba international footballers
Association football defenders
FC Ciudad de La Habana players
Olympic footballers of Cuba
Footballers at the 1976 Summer Olympics
Pan American Games medalists in football
Pan American Games bronze medalists for Cuba
Footballers at the 1971 Pan American Games
Medalists at the 1971 Pan American Games
20th-century Cuban people